Hell Pizza is a New Zealand-based pizza chain. It was established in Wellington (Kelburn) in 1996 and has since expanded around New Zealand.

Franchises have also operated at various times in the United Kingdom, Ireland, Canada, South Korea, India and Queensland, Australia.

History

Hell Pizza was founded by Warren Powell, Callum Davies, and Stuart McMullin in 1995, as a pizza shop in Kelburn, Wellington next to Victoria University of Wellington.

The founders sold the New Zealand Master Franchise rights to Tasman Pacific Foods (the New Zealand master franchisee for Burger King) for $15 million in 2006. They purchased the rights back in 2009.

In 2009, Hell had 61 stores in New Zealand. It had 6 stores in Brisbane and was planning nine more around South East Queensland. It was also trialing stores in Fulham, London and Dublin, Ireland.

In July 2010, after hackers attacked the Hell Pizza customer database, 230,000 customers were advised to change their passwords.

In 2012, Hell had 65 stores in New Zealand. It had three stores in South Korea and was planning seven more. It had two stores in Queensland, but eight others had closed. A pizza bar in New Delhi and its stores in London, Dublin, and Vancouver were still operating.

In 2016, Hell Pizza had 66 outlets, all in New Zealand.

, Hell Pizza had 77 outlets across New Zealand, with 61 in the North Island (including 28 in Auckland) and 16 in the South Island.

Marketing
The Hell theme is used in the menu. Hell Pizza offers seven standard pizzas which are named after the seven deadly sins. The chain also offers discounted pizzas on Friday the 13th.

The company is known for its controversial advertising and for being the first company in New Zealand to offer online pizza ordering, in 1996. They sponsored a segment on the television show Pulp Sport.

Condoms

On 31 October 2006 Hell announced through a press release it would be promoting its "Lust" pizza by distributing 170,000 branded condoms. The Family First Lobby said Hell has "crossed the line of what is decent and acceptable advertising material to be put in letterboxes of families". It was later revealed that the condoms failed to comply with New Zealand labelling and packaging requirements, and remaining stocks were destroyed.

Mocking of Christianity
A radio advertisement that featured a conversation about Hell attracted one complaint in New Zealand. The Advertising Standards Authority ASA did not uphold the complaint since "it did not reach the threshold to be likely to cause serious or widespread offence".

"Selling your soul"
Hell Pizza used the expression "sell your soul" in mass advertising in 2013 in New Zealand. It received one complaint from the ASA. The ASA ruled that there were no grounds to proceed, since "sell your soul" is a common saying and recognized the saying as dark and satirical. Hell also purchased the soul of a 24-year-old Wanganui man for $5,001, after the online auction website Trademe withdrew his attempt to sell it there.

Halloween dead celebrities
In November 2008, while under management from Tasman Foods, Hell Pizza New Zealand apologized for an advertisement featuring the skeletal remains of Sir Edmund Hillary, Heath Ledger, and the Queen Mother, dancing on gravestones. The apology was made to Hillary's family, which complained the ad was in "extremely poor taste". The ad was withdrawn from the company's website on November 3.

Pizza Roulette
In 2012, Hell Pizza marketed 'Pizza Roulette', in which one unidentified slice of a pizza is doused with chili. Marketing called it the "hottest chili known to mankind".

Real Rabbit Campaign
In April 2014, Hell Pizza released a rabbit-flavored pizza for Easter and advertised it in New Zealand on billboards covered in rabbit pelts. The billboard has received both criticism and praise; the New Zealand Vegetarian Society criticized the billboard.

Greta Thunberg advertisement
In October 2021, Hell Pizza drew media attention and controversy after launching an advertisement campaign telling Swedish climate change activist Greta Thunberg "to go to Hell" in response to her remarks criticizing New Zealand's efforts to address climate change. Hell Pizza CEO Ben Cumming confirmed he has sent a personal invitation to Thunberg to witness the company's efforts to address climate change, environmental pollution, and reduce waste. The company had attempted to secure a large billboard for the advertisement in Thunberg's hometown of Stockholm, but local authorities had deemed it offensive.

Charitable donations
In 2009, Hell Pizza owner Warren Powell verbally pledged to pay all proceeds from a Hell takeaway van at the Big Night In Telethon to the charity KidsCan, amounting to about NZ$10,000. Julie Nelson, chief executive of the charity, said "after seeing reports that some of the money raised was failing to reach needy children, Powell reneged on the deal." On 14 August 2011, the Hell Pizza Facebook page stated "We can confirm that we have now contributed $10,000 to the KidsCan Charitable Trust."

Labelling
In June 2019, the fake meat of a burger pizza, made by Beyond Meat, met food standards but caused controversy as it was labelled as a "burger" pizza but contained vegan burger patties.

See also

List of restaurants in New Zealand
List of pizza chains

References

External links 
Hell Systems 
Hell Ireland 
Hell New Zealand
Hell India

Pizza chains
Restaurants established in 1996
Fast-food chains of New Zealand
Theme restaurants
New Zealand companies established in 1996